Antony Roland Kay (born 21 October 1982) is an English semi-professional footballer who plays as a defender or midfielder for Cymru Premier side Bala Town.

He began his career with hometown club Barnsley, and made his first-team debut in August 2000. Established as a first-team regular by the age of 20, he was voted as the club's Player of the Season in 2003–04, and helped Barnsley to win promotion out of League One via the play-offs in 2006 after scoring the winning penalty in the shoot-out victory over Swansea City. He signed with Tranmere Rovers in June 2007, and was voted the club's Player of the Season for 2008–09, before moving on to Huddersfield Town in May 2009. He was again promoted into the Championship after victory in the 2012 League One play-off final. However he stayed in League One after joining Milton Keynes Dons in August 2012, and won his third promotion out of the division after helping the club to secure runners-up spot in 2014–15. He signed with Bury in June 2016, and played 47 matches as club captain, before moving on to Port Vale a year later. Released after two years in the Vale first-team, he went on to join non-league Chorley in January 2020. He joined Cymru Premier side Bala Town eight months later.

Club career

Barnsley
Born in Barnsley, South Yorkshire, Kay began his career in the youth system at hometown club Barnsley, signing a professional contract in October 1999. He made his first-team debut under Dave Bassett on 12 August 2000, in a 1–0 victory over Norwich City at Oakwell. He ended the 2000–01 season with seven First Division appearances to his name, and featured just once in the 2001–02 relegation campaign. Initially a midfielder, he was moved to centre back after Glyn Hodges took over from Nigel Spackman as manager in October 2002. He played 16 Second Division matches in the 2002–03 season.

He established himself as the club's utility player following the appointment of manager Guðjón Þórðarson in June 2003, and in addition to operating across the defence and midfield was also utilised as a target man striker in January, picking up a man-of-the-match award in that role against AFC Bournemouth. He scored four goals in 51 appearances across the 2003–04 campaign, and was voted the club's Player of the Season. He signed a new one-year contract in June 2004.

Speaking in December 2004, manager Paul Hart said that "it's slightly too early to say whether he'll stay as a centre-half or return to midfield in his career", but was able to say that Kay had "shown that when he is concentrating he is as good as anybody" in both defence and midfield. He scored six goals from 43 appearances in the 2004–05 campaign as Barnsley posted a 13th-place finish. He played 45 times in the 2005–06 season, and scored the fourth and final Barnsley penalty in the play-off final penalty shoot-out victory over Swansea City at the Millennium Stadium, in which Andy Ritchie's "Tykes" gained promotion to the Championship. He played 33 matches in the 2006–07 season as Barnsley retained their second tier status with a 20th-place finish, but was rumoured to have had a bust-up with manager Simon Davey in February, and his future with the club was put into doubt three months later after he allegedly broke club rules.

Tranmere Rovers
Kay signed a two-year contract with League One club Tranmere Rovers in June 2007. He scored seven goals from 43 matches in the 2007–08 season, playing mainly in his natural position of centre back, which led manager Ronnie Moore to consider playing him as a goalscoring midfielder. Moore shifted him forward into midfield during the 2008–09 season, and Kay went on to score 12 goals in 53 appearances as Tranmere narrowly missed out on the play-offs after conceding a late equaliser at Scunthorpe United on the final day of the season. Kay was voted as the club's Player of the Season for 2008–09.

Huddersfield Town
Kay joined League One club Huddersfield Town on a two-year contract in May 2009; manager Lee Clark said that "he is a strong, physical player and we have identified that we need that presence in the side". He spent the 2009–10 season as a first-team regular in midfield, making 46 starts in league and cup competitions. Huddersfield qualified for the play-offs, and were knocked out by Millwall at the semi-final stage after losing 2–0 on aggregate. He was reduced to the role of substitute for parts of the 2010–11 campaign. He did though score both the extra-time equaliser and the winning penalty in the subsequent shoot-out victory over Bournemouth in the play-off semi-final second leg at the Galpharm Stadium on 18 May. Eleven days later, Huddersfield went on to lose 3–0 to Peterborough United in the play-off final at Old Trafford.

Kay signed a new two-year contract in July 2011. He was limited to 28 league matches in the 2011–12 season, and was not in the matchday squad as Town secured promotion with victory over Sheffield United in the play-off final at Wembley Stadium. Manager Simon Grayson signed centre backs Joel Lynch and Anthony Gerrard in the summer 2012 transfer window, and subsequently looked to move Kay on to a new club.

Milton Keynes Dons
Kay had his contract with Huddersfield cancelled by mutual consent and signed a two-year contract with League One club Milton Keynes Dons in August 2012. He made 42 appearances across the 2012–13 campaign as the Dons missed out on the play-offs after finishing two places and four points behind sixth-placed Swindon Town. In September 2013, he underwent surgery to correct a persistent hip problem, and was out of action for 12 weeks. He recovered to play a total of 34 matches by the end of the 2013–14 campaign, during which time he also sent off three times. He signed a new one-year contract in May 2014, having helped Karl Robinson's Dons to keep eight clean sheets in his 30 league matches on the way to a tenth-place finish.

Kay missed just one of the club's 46 league matches in the 2014–15 season as the Dons secured promotion out of League One with a second-place finish behind champions Bristol City. He signed a new one-year contract in June 2015. He played 34 Championship matches in the 2015–16 season as the Dons were relegated in 23rd-place. On 5 April, Kay made a late challenge on Wolverhampton Wanderers striker Michał Żyro which left Zyro suffering with multiple knee ligament damage and over a year-long recovery. In May 2016, Kay was one of four players released from the club following relegation back into League One.

Bury
On 19 June 2016, Kay joined League One club Bury on a two-year contract. Six weeks later he was appointed as club captain by manager David Flitcroft. However, Bury endured a poor start to the season, leaving tensions high as Kay and teammate Tom Soares had to be separated from each other after exchanging heated words following a 5–1 defeat to AFC Wimbledon at the Kingsmeadow on 19 November. Bury's form did turn around over the new year though, and Kay praised manager Chris Brass for changing to a 5–3–2 formation and halting a club record 12-match losing streak and 17-match winless run.

Port Vale
On 28 June 2017, Kay secured his release from Bury and signed a two-year contract with League Two club Port Vale, who had been relegated after finishing two places and one point behind Bury the previous season. He was appointed as club captain by manager Michael Brown. He scored a headed goal on his debut for the "Valiants" in a 3–1 win at Crawley Town on 5 August. However he was dropped by new manager Neil Aspin in October, who also gave the captaincy to Danny Pugh. Kay did though make a quick return to the first team playing out-of-position in midfield. On 12 December, he scored the "goal of his life" with a stunning long-range lob in a 3–2 defeat at Yeovil Town in the FA Cup. He maintained his new position as a holding central midfield player until the end of February, when he was both suspended for picking up ten yellow cards over the campaign and also ruled out of action for a month after undergoing a hernia operation. He marked his return from injury on 2 April by scoring what would go on to win him the club's goal of the season award, his long-range strike helping to secure a 2–2 draw at local rivals Crewe Alexandra. Two weeks later he was named on the EFL team of the week for scoring the only goal of a 1–0 win over Lincoln City. Kay featured 33 times during the 2018–19 season; however manager John Askey confirmed that he would not be offering Kay a new contract on 16 May.

Chorley
On 16 January 2020, Kay signed a deal to join National League club Chorley until the end of the 2019–20 season. He made four appearances for the "Magpies" in the 2019–20 season, which was permanently suspended on 26 March due to the COVID-19 pandemic in England, with Chorley bottom of the table.

Bala Town
On 24 August 2020, Kay joined Cymru Premier side Bala Town. He scored five goals from 28 appearances in the 2020–21 season. He featured 26 times in the 2021–22 campaign, and scored one goal in an 11–0 victory over Penybont at Maes Tegid on the final day of the season as Bala secured runners-up spot in the league.

International career
Kay was capped once by the England national under-18 team, coming on as a substitute in a 0–0 draw with Switzerland on 30 May 2001.

Style of play
Kay plays as a centre back, but can also operate as a holding midfielder; early in his career he was something of a utility player, having also filled in at full back and as a striker on occasion. Bury Times journalist Mikael McKenzie stated that he is a solid all-round defender, is capable in the air and has good positional skills.

Career statistics

Honours
Barnsley
Football League One play-offs: 2006

Milton Keynes Dons
Football League One second-place promotion: 2014–15

Individual
Barnsley Player of the Season: 2003–04
Tranmere Rovers Player of the Season: 2008–09

References

External links

1982 births
Living people
Footballers from Barnsley
English footballers
England youth international footballers
Association football defenders
Association football midfielders
Association football utility players
Barnsley F.C. players
Tranmere Rovers F.C. players
Huddersfield Town A.F.C. players
Milton Keynes Dons F.C. players
Bury F.C. players
Port Vale F.C. players
Chorley F.C. players
Bala Town F.C. players
English Football League players
Cymru Premier players